Ihor Dmytrovych Reizlin (born 7 December 1984 in Bender, Moldavian SSR) is a Ukrainian right-handed épée fencer and 2021 individual Olympic bronze medalist.

Medal Record

Olympic Games

World Championship

European Championship

Grand Prix

World Cup

References

External links

Profile at the European Fencing Confederation

1984 births
People from Bender, Moldova
Living people
Ukrainian male épée fencers
Universiade medalists in fencing
Universiade bronze medalists for Ukraine
Medalists at the 2009 Summer Universiade
World Fencing Championships medalists
Fencers at the 2020 Summer Olympics
Medalists at the 2020 Summer Olympics
Olympic medalists in fencing
Olympic fencers of Ukraine
Olympic bronze medalists for Ukraine
20th-century Ukrainian people
21st-century Ukrainian people